Thomas Vincent Savini (born November 3, 1946) is an American prosthetic makeup artist, actor, stunt performer and film director. He is known for his makeup and special effects work on many films directed by George A. Romero, including Martin, Dawn of the Dead, Day of the Dead, Creepshow and Monkey Shines; he also created the special effects and makeup for many cult classics like Friday the 13th (parts I and IV), Maniac, The Burning, The Prowler and The Texas Chainsaw Massacre 2.

Savini directed Night of the Living Dead, the 1990 remake of Romero's 1968 Night of the Living Dead; his other directing work includes three episodes of the TV show Tales from the Darkside and one segment in The Theatre Bizarre. As an actor and stuntman, he has appeared in films such as Martin, Dawn of the Dead, Knightriders, From Dusk till Dawn, Planet Terror, Machete, Django Unchained and Machete Kills.

Early life
Savini was born on November 3, 1946, in Pittsburgh, Pennsylvania, and is of Italian descent. He was raised Catholic and graduated from Central Catholic High School. As a boy, his inspiration was actor Lon Chaney Sr., and Savini attributes his earliest desires to create makeup effects to Chaney and the film Man of a Thousand Faces. 

Experimenting with whatever medium he could find, the young Savini practiced creating makeup effects on himself, later convincing his friends to let him practice his craft on them. He also discovered another passion, acting. Combining his makeup applications and homemade costumes, he especially enjoyed scaring his friends. Savini attended Point Park University for three years, before enlisting in the United States Army. After his tour in Vietnam, he attended Carnegie-Mellon University, as the first undergraduate to be awarded a full fellowship in the acting and directing program. He appeared in stage productions throughout college and continued on stage long after his tour of duty in Vietnam.

Savini served as a combat photographer during the Vietnam War.  In a 2002 interview, he told the Pittsburgh Post "When I was in Vietnam I was a combat photographer. My job was to shoot images of damage to machines and to people. Through my lens, I saw some hideous [stuff]. To cope with it, I guess I tried to think of it as special effects. Now, as an artist, I just think of creating the effect within the limitations we have to deal with."  He continued to practice with makeup in Vietnam, often frightening indigenous peasants by appearing to suddenly transform into a "monster". 

Using the lens of his camera, Savini separated himself from the real life horrors of war; however, all the images still haunted his mind. Savini said his wartime experiences influenced his eventual style of gory effects: "I hated that when I watched a war movie and someone dies. Some people die with one eye open and one eye half-closed, sometimes people die with smiles on their faces because the jaw is always slack. I incorporated the feeling of the stuff I saw in Vietnam into my work." 

In 1970, while on guard duty, a flare was triggered in the jungle area Savini was watching. Against military protocol, Savini fired into the bush without informing his superiors. Other soldiers likewise began firing until a duck wandered from the bush completely unharmed. Due to his failure to follow orders, Savini was taken off guard duty from his bunker on the following evening. That same evening, the bunker came under attack and several soldiers were wounded or killed. As a result of this incident, Savini earned the nickname "Duck Slayer" and to this day will not eat duck.

Among the many talents Savini achieved as a young man was the art of fencing, he is a tournament fencer as well as an accomplished gymnast. Much of his stunt work and some of his characters reflect these graceful abilities; however, he is also accomplished with a bull whip and can easily execute a motorcycle stunt. Many of his characters have been bikers or madmen who are hardened and eerily evil.

Career
Savini is primarily known for his groundbreaking work in the field of special make-up effects, also known as prosthetic makeup. His signature style and techniques bring vivid realism to genre films. Early in Savini's career, Dick Smith became an inspiration and a guide, later becoming an associate at Savini's Special Make-up Effects Program. Among other projects, Smith is known for his groundbreaking work in The Exorcist.

Savini got his breakthrough working with Pittsburgh filmmaker George A. Romero, providing a convincing wrist-slashing effect in the opening scenes of Martin (1978). The following year, working with a larger budget on Dawn of the Dead, Savini created his signature palette of severed limbs and bite-marks. In the 1980 slasher film Friday the 13th, Savini expanded his repertoire of blood and gore. He continued to perfect those techniques in another film that year, Maniac. 

Along with the 1981 films The Burning and The Prowler, Savini earned the nickname "The Sultan of Splatter". In 1982, he created more traditional horror effects in the film Creepshow directed by George A. Romero and written by Stephen King. In 1984, he agreed to work on Friday the 13th: The Final Chapter, where he killed his creation Jason Voorhees. Returning to the zombie  genre in 1985, Savini was nominated and won the 1985 Saturn Award for Best Makeup Effects for his work on the Romero's Day of the Dead. In 1986, Savini worked with director Tobe Hooper on the film The Texas Chainsaw Massacre 2. 

Savini has also worked on films by Italian director Dario Argento, first in 1990 on the film Two Evil Eyes and again on the 1993 film Trauma. In the 1991 film Heartstopper, he created special effects for director John A. Russo. Although focusing more on his acting career in recent years, Savini has continued to be active with special makeup effects and in 2011 supervised the effects for the Australian film Redd Inc.

As an actor, Savini has appeared in many of the same films he was creating effects for. His first appearance was a relatively straight, innocuous character in Martin in 1978; however, he played a menacing biker called Blades in his next film Dawn of the Dead (1978), a role he reprised in zombie form with a cameo appearance in the 2005 continuation of the series, Land of the Dead. In the 1980 film Maniac, his brief role in the film found him facing the maniac's shotgun and having his head blown off in a spectacular display. Savini had a more prominent role as biker and antagonist Morgan, the Black Knight, in George A. Romero's Knightriders (1981). Continuing with the biker theme, Savini played the universally recognized, whip-wielding, vampire-fighting biker "Sex Machine" in the 1996 Quentin Tarantino/Robert Rodriguez film From Dusk till Dawn. (This character was a riff on Blades from Dawn of the Dead replete with the same costume.)

In 2007, Savini had a role in Planet Terror, one of two stories in the Grindhouse film, directed by Robert Rodriguez. Savini plays Deputy Tolo, who fights to save his town from an infestation of zombie-like creatures. In another Rodriguez film, Machete, based on a fake movie trailer played during the film Grindhouse, Savini played Osiris Amanpour, hired to track and kill the protagonist Machete. Savini reprised his role in the sequel, Machete Kills. 

Throughout the years, Savini has appeared in movie roles from cameos as the vampire David Van Etten in Lost Boys: The Tribe;as the sheriff in the 2004 Dawn of the Dead remake; or tongue in cheek characters like Jesus Christ in Zombiegeddon (2003). 

In 2006, Savini essayed the role of Prester John, the mythical villain in the dreamlike Sea of Dust. That year also saw the release of Johannes Roberts' Forest of the Damned, in which Savini played a mad hermit surrounded by angels cast from heaven. In 2008, he made a brief appearance in Zack & Miri Make a Porno as a thieving slumlord. He also appeared in The Dead Matter, along with Andrew Divoff and Jim O'Rear. Savini voiced himself on The Simpsons episode "Worst Episode Ever". 

While making an appearance at Android's Dungeon, Savini performs the "Gutbuster" gag, covering the crowd in "blood and guts" and consequently humiliating the Comic Book Guy. In 2012, Savini appeared as a shop teacher, Mr. Callahan, in the Pittsburgh-set teen drama The Perks of Being a Wallflower, starring Logan Lerman. Savini also appeared as one of the Trackers in Quentin Tarantino's Django Unchained. Future projects include Savini starring in the Nazi zombie film The 4th Reich directed by Shaun Robert Smith, playing the role of SS-Standartenführer Oskar Dirlewanger. 

As a film director, Savini helmed episodes of the syndicated television series Tales from the Darkside, the aforementioned 1990 color remake of Night of the Living Dead; and House Call, the pilot of the proposed series The Chill Factor, which starred Pittsburgh actor Bingo O'Malley. In 2011, he directed "Wet Dreams", one of six segments to the horror film The Theatre Bizarre. In 2009, Savini announced his plan to direct a new film, Death Island, with special make-up effects by his former protege Greg Nicotero. On September 1, 2013, Savini began a crowd funding project on Indiegogo for Death Island. His plans were to begin filming by the end of 2013.

In the 2008 novel Bad Moon Rising by Jonathan Maberry, Savini appears as one of the real-world horror celebrities who are in the fictional town of Pine Deep when monsters attack; other celebrities include James Gunn, Jim O'Rear, Brinke Stevens, Ken Foree, Stephen Susco, Debbie Rochon, Joe Bob Briggs and blues man Mem Shannon.

Savini also briefly took part in Jerry Lawler's 2010 revival of the Memphis Wrestling pro wrestling television show. His on-screen character sent horror-movie monsters (played by wrestlers from the Memphis area) onto the show to get revenge for Savini who blamed Lawler for the death of Savini's friend Andy Kaufman; the monsters' handler was manager "Hollywood" Jimmy Blaylock.

In 2012, American filmmaker Jason Baker debuted a biography of Savini entitled Smoke and Mirrors: The Story of Tom Savini.

He stated during a Q&A with fans that the hardest movie he has ever worked on was Creepshow because it was "5 movies in 1".

In 2018, Savini announced via his Instagram that he would be directing a horror web series, in collaboration with others, including Tina Romero, George A. Romero's daughter. Special effects for the web series will be completed by Savini's students at Douglas Education Center. The web series is currently in production.

In May 2019, Slipknot lead singer and frontman Corey Taylor said in an interview that Tom Savini worked to produce and create his new masks for the upcoming We Are Not Your Kind album and subsequent tour cycles. Around the same time, Savini was approached by wrestler Bray Wyatt to design the mask for his brand new "Fiend" character.

FX education

Savini runs the Tom Savini's Special Make-Up Effects Program at the Douglas Education Center in Monessen, Pennsylvania. Savini is happy to say that he refers offers he receives for movie make-up effects projects to his students and graduates of his school as well. 

Savini is the author of several books on special effects including Grande Illusions I and II (1983, 1994) which detail the production and mechanical workings of many of his famous film effects. In Horror F/X, a 1989 direct-to-video interview conducted by frequent collaborator John A. Russo, Savini explains many of his effects techniques, illustrated by film clips and behind-the-scenes video footage. He is also associated with other books in the horror genre including Book of the Dead and Horror 101 for which he wrote the foreword. Savini has also appeared in public demonstrating his effects, including appearances in the 1980s on Late Night With David Letterman in which he demonstrated such effects as "fire gel" and a gunshot to the head on Letterman himself.

Filmography

As an actor
Films

Television

Video games

As a make-up artist/special effects technician

As a director

Bibliography
 Grande Illusions: A Learn-By-Example Guide to the Art and Technique of Special Make-Up Effects from the Films of Tom Savini 
 Grande Illusions II 
 Bizarro! (A reissue of Grande Illusions, arbitrarily re-titled by its publisher)

References
https://www.pittsburghcurrent.com/savini-pittsburgh/

External links

 
 

1946 births
Living people
Male actors from Pittsburgh
American male film actors
American film directors
American make-up artists
United States Army personnel of the Vietnam War
American photographers
American stunt performers
Carnegie Mellon University College of Fine Arts alumni
Horror film directors
Point Park University alumni
Special effects people
American people of Italian descent
United States Army soldiers
Central Catholic High School (Pittsburgh) alumni